The year 1999 was the third year in the history of M-1 Global, a mixed martial arts promotion based in Russia. In 1999 M-1 Global held 2 events beginning with, M-1 MFC: World Championship 1999.

Events list

M-1 MFC: World Championship 1999

M-1 MFC: World Championship 1999 was an event held on April 9, 1999, in Saint Petersburg, Russia.

Results

M-1 MFC: Russia Open Tournament

M-1 MFC: Russia Open Tournament was an event held on December 5, 1999, in Saint Petersburg, Russia.

Results

See also 
 M-1 Global

References

M-1 Global events
1999 in mixed martial arts